Sandyville is a city in Warren County, Iowa, United States. The population was 58 at the time of the 2020 census.  It is part of the Des Moines–West Des Moines Metropolitan Statistical Area.

History
Sandyville was laid out in 1851. It was named for its founder, J. Moorman Sandy.

Geography
Sandyville is located at  (41.370224, -93.385675).

Demographics

2010 census
As of the census of 2010, there were 51 people, 23 households, and 16 families living in the city. The racial makeup of the city was 98.0% White and 2.0% African American.

There were 23 households, of which 17.4% had children under the age of 18 living with them, 60.9% were married couples living together, 8.7% had a male householder with no wife present, and 30.4% were non-families. 26.1% of all households were made up of individuals, and 13% had someone living alone who was 65 years of age or older. The average household size was 2.22 and the average family size was 2.63.

The median age in the city was 47.4 years. 11.8% of residents were under the age of 18; 9.8% were between the ages of 18 and 24; 21.6% were from 25 to 44; 39.1% were from 45 to 64; and 17.6% were 65 years of age or older. The gender makeup of the city was 47.1% male and 52.9% female.

2000 census
As of the census of 2000, there were 61 people, 27 households, and 18 families living in the city. The racial makeup of the city was 95.08% White, and 4.92% from two or more races. Hispanic or Latino of any race were 4.92% of the population.

There were 27 households, out of which 25.9% had children under the age of 18 living with them, 55.6% were married couples living together, 11.1% had a female householder with no husband present, and 33.3% were non-families. 33.3% of all households were made up of individuals, and 11.1% had someone living alone who was 65 years of age or older. The average household size was 2.26 and the average family size was 2.89.

In the city, the population was spread out, with 16.4% under the age of 18, 16.4% from 18 to 24, 27.9% from 25 to 44, 34.4% from 45 to 64, and 4.9% who were 65 years of age or older. The median age was 40 years. For every 100 females, there were 134.6 males. For every 100 females age 18 and over, there were 155.0 males.

The median income for a household in the city was $31,667, and the median income for a family was $34,375. Males had a median income of $27,500 versus $13,750 for females. The per capita income for the city was $20,028. None of the population and none of the families were below the poverty line.

References

Cities in Iowa
Cities in Warren County, Iowa
Des Moines metropolitan area
1851 establishments in Iowa